{{Speciesbox
| taxon = Conus cuneolus
| image = Conus cuneolus 1.jpg
| image2 = Conus cuneolus 2.jpg
| image_caption = Apertural and abapertural views of shell of  Conus cuneolus Reeve, L.A., 1844
| status = EN
| status_system = IUCN3.1 
| status_ref = 
| authority = Reeve, 1843
| synonyms_ref = 
| synonyms =
 Africonus cuneolus (Reeve, 1843)
 Conus anthonyi (Petuch, 1975)
 Conus bernardinoi (Cossignani, 2014)
 Conus fontonae Rolán & Trovão, 1990
 Conus mordeirae Rolán & Trovão, 1990
 Conus pseudocuneolus Röckel, Rolán & Monteiro, 1980
 Conus serranegrae Rolán, 1990
 Conus (Lautoconus) cuneolus Reeve, 1843 accepted, alternate representation
| display_parents = 3
}}Conus cuneolus is a species of sea snail, a marine gastropod mollusk in the family Conidae, the cone snails and their allies.

Like all species within the genus Conus, these snails are predatory and venomous. They are capable of "stinging" humans, therefore live ones should be handled carefully or not at all.

Description
The size of the shell varies between 17 mm and 33 mm. The shell is shortly turbinated, wide at the shoulder, and somewhat inflated. Its color is chestnut- or chocolate-brown, with small white maculations, forming an obscure band at the shoulder, and another below the middle, as well as somewhat scattered over the rest of the surface, including the convex spire.

Distribution
This species occurs in the Atlantic Ocean off the Cape Verdes, where it is restricted to the southwestern part of the island of Sal.

References

 Afonso C.M.L. & Tenorio M.J. (2004) Conus cuneolus Reeve, 1843 and related species in Sal Island, Cape Verde Archipelago (Gastropoda, Conidae). Visaya 1(1
 Tucker J.K. & Tenorio M.J. (2009) Systematic classification of Recent and fossil conoidean gastropods.'' Hackenheim: Conchbooks. 296 pp.
  Puillandre N., Duda T.F., Meyer C., Olivera B.M. & Bouchet P. (2015). One, four or 100 genera? A new classification of the cone snails. Journal of Molluscan Studies. 81: 1–23

External links
 The Conus Biodiversity website
 Cone Shells – Knights of the Sea
 

cuneolus
Gastropods of Cape Verde
Fauna of Sal, Cape Verde
Endemic fauna of Cape Verde
Gastropods described in 1843